Events from the year 1413 in Ireland.

Incumbent
Lord: Henry IV (until 20 March), then Henry V

Events

Births

Deaths
 John Dongan, Bishop of Down

 
1410s in Ireland
Ireland
Years of the 15th century in Ireland